BiP is a freeware instant messaging application developed by Lifecell Ventures Cooperatief U.A., a subsidiary of Turkcell incorporated in the Netherlands. It allows users to send text messages, voice messages and video calling, and it can be downloaded from App Store, Google Play, and Huawei AppGallery. BiP has over 53 million users worldwide, and was first released in 2013.

BiP is a secure, and free communication platform. BiP allows making video and audio call, allow sharing images, videos and location. BiP also include instant translations to 106 languages and exchange rates. President Erdoğan's Communications Office opposed WhatsApp's enforcement of its updated privacy policy and announced that Erdoğan left WhatsApp and opened an account in Telegram and BiP. The Turkish Ministry of National Defense has announced that it will move information groups to BiP for the same reason.

Burak AKINCI is CEO of BiP. The number of download of the app is 80 million globally.

See also 

 Comparison of instant messaging clients
 Comparison of VoIP software
 List of most-downloaded Google Play applications
 Comparison of user features of messaging platforms

References 

Instant messaging clients
Mobile applications
2013 software
Turkish brands
Android (operating system) software
IOS software
Social media
VoIP software
Cross-platform software
Communication software
Software companies of Turkey